Aurora Center Historic District is a historic district in Aurora, Ohio, United States.  Listed on the National Register of Historic Places in 1974, it contains 21 contributing buildings.

References 

Historic districts on the National Register of Historic Places in Ohio
Geography of Portage County, Ohio
National Register of Historic Places in Portage County, Ohio
Aurora, Ohio